The Bennett Bridge is a historic covered bridge in rural northern Oxford County, Maine. Built in 1901, it is one of Maine's few older covered bridges. The bridge was listed on the National Register of Historic Places in 1970.

Description
The bridge is a Paddleford truss bridge, a type of truss in which diagonal cross members are connected to King posts, fastened by metal bolts. Its total width is 16'8", with an interior roadway width of 14'8". Its sides are clad in vertical boarding roughly 2/3 of the way to the roof; the ends are also clad in vertical boarding above and around the portals.

Bennett Bridge was built in 1901, to provide access from a handful of small farms to Maine State Route 16, the major road through Lincoln Plantation.  It spans the Magalloway River at a point where it is swiftly flowing, passing through a fairly narrow valley in the hilly region.  The bridge saw heavy use from logging trucks that also worked in the area, and was closed to traffic in 1985.

See also
National Register of Historic Places listings in Oxford County, Maine
List of bridges on the National Register of Historic Places in Maine
List of Maine covered bridges

References

Covered bridges on the National Register of Historic Places in Maine
Bridges completed in 1901
Bridges in Oxford County, Maine
National Register of Historic Places in Oxford County, Maine
Road bridges on the National Register of Historic Places in Maine
Wooden bridges in Maine
King post truss bridges in the United States
1901 establishments in Maine